Avondale  is a community in the Canadian province of Nova Scotia, located in the Municipal District of West Hants.

References
Avondale on Destination Nova Scotia

Communities in Hants County, Nova Scotia